is a 1995 rallying video game developed by Dragnet and published by Visco Corporation for the Super Famicom. It is the third game in the Drift Out series, and was followed by Neo Drift Out: New Technology; unlike the previous Drift Out '94: The Hard Order, it resembles the first Drift Out and is sometimes referred to as a port or remake for that reason.

All races in this video game are based on the 1994 World Rally Championship season. Two different types of background music ('normal' and 'hard' beats) and three racing levels (easy, normal, and hard) are available. The top six times are tracked in each of the rally legs; including the super special stage.

A North American release was planned by Accolade, though it was never released. The North American version would have featured fake manufacturer names.

Gameplay

The player has to finish among the top six race car drivers at the end of each full round. Failing to complete this task will end the game with premature elimination from the world rally. Licensed rally cars from around the world are included in the game for every car. The only exception is the European edition of Ford Escort due to licensing issues; rally races are never done using the North American model. As a result, the Ford Escort RS Cosworth featured in the game was renamed the "Tord Ecorst"; this was also done with the previous Drift Out '94: The Hard Order.

The first level is intended for new players. For beating this level, the player will be told to try a harder level and will be given the closing credits. Normal games start at the second level. However, the player does not have to deal with the consequences of crashing the vehicle until the third level. Crashing the car will send the player back to the start, where the time is reset for another chance (and all automobile damage is fixed). After beating the most difficult level of the game, the full credits are played.

All three levels can be used in either the world rally mode or the time trial mode. Target times are reduced when a harder level of difficulty is introduced in the race.

Reception
On release, Famicom Tsūshin scored the game a 23 out of 40.

See also
Neo Drift Out: New Technology

References

1995 video games
Drift Out series
Japan-exclusive video games
Off-road racing video games
Sports video games set in France
Super Nintendo Entertainment System games
Super Nintendo Entertainment System-only games
Video games scored by Kenji Yamazaki
Video games set in 1994
Video games set in Africa
Video games set in England
Visco Corporation games
Video games developed in Japan